DXEP (91.1 FM), broadcasting as 91.1 Pacman Radio, is a radio station owned and operated by JMP Mass Media Production. The station's studio is located along Yumang St., Brgy. San Isidro, General Santos.

References

External links
 

Radio stations in General Santos
Radio stations established in 2011
News and talk radio stations in the Philippines